The following is a list of soundtrack releases for the American crime drama television series Miami Vice (1984–1990).

Miami Vice

Charts

Certifications

Miami Vice II

Notes
  signifies a co-producer

Charts

Certifications

Miami Vice III

Charts

The Best of Miami Vice (1989)

Charts

Miami Vice: The Complete Collection

In 2002, after extensive pressure from fans of the show, Jan Hammer finally released a more comprehensive collection of the score music he wrote for Miami Vice. While the first disc contained music that had already been released on previous soundtracks (namely the three Miami Vice albums and Hammer's own album, Escape from Television), the second CD featured cues that had never previously been released in any format. However, the album was released in only limited numbers and today copies can sell for over $100. The album can be downloaded in its entirety, along with a bonus track, from Hammer's official website.

The Best of Miami Vice (2006)

Charts

References

Bibliography

External links
 
 Official Jan Hammer website

Soundtracks
1985 soundtrack albums
1986 soundtrack albums
1988 soundtrack albums
2002 soundtrack albums
2006 soundtrack albums
Film and television discographies
Hip-O Records soundtracks
Jan Hammer albums
MCA Records soundtracks
One Way Records compilation albums
Television soundtracks
Universal Music Enterprises compilation albums
Lists of soundtracks